The 1946 Coast Guard Bears football team was an American football team that represented the United States Coast Guard Academy as an independent during the 1946 college football season. In their first season under head coach Nelson Nitchman, the team compiled a 3–5 record and were outscored by a total of 220 to 112.

The team played its home games  in New London, Connecticut.

Schedule

References

Coast Guard
Coast Guard Bears football
Coast Guard football